This is a list of active youth orchestras. National youth orchestras are highlighted in bold.

Asia 

 Arab Youth Philharmonic Orchestra
 Asian Youth Orchestra

Afghanistan 
 Afghan Youth Orchestra

Cambodia 
 Angkor National Youth Orchestra

China 
 National Youth Orchestra of China
 Guangzhou Symphony Youth Orchestra

Hong Kong 
 Metropolitan Youth Orchestra of Hong Kong
 Hong Kong Festival Orchestra

India 
 India National Youth Orchestra

Iraq 
 National Youth Orchestra of Iraq

Israel 
 Young Israel Philharmonic Orchestra

Japan 
 Fukushima Youth Sinfonietta

Malaysia 
 Malaysian Philharmonic Youth Orchestra

Singapore 
 Singapore National Youth Orchestra

Thailand 
 Siam Sinfonietta

Turkey 
 Turkish National Youth Philharmonic Orchestra

Africa

South Africa 
 South African National Youth Orchestra Foundation
 Johannesburg Youth Orchestra

Europe 

European Union Youth Orchestra
 European Union Baroque Orchestra
 Gustav Mahler Youth Orchestra
 Internationale Junge Orchesterakademie
 Junges Klangforum Mitte Europa
 Kremerata Baltica
 Baltic Sea Philharmonic

Austria 
 Wiener Jeunesse Orchester

Denmark 
 Danish Youth Ensemble

Finland 
 Helsinki Strings

France 
 Orchestre Français des Jeunes

Germany 
 Bundesjugendorchester
 Junge Deutsche Philharmonie
 Deutsche Streicherphilharmonie
 Landesjugendorchester Baden-Württemberg

Greece 
 Greek Youth Symphony Orchestra

Ireland 
 National Youth Orchestra of Ireland
 Cross Border Orchestra of Ireland
 Galway Youth Orchestra

Italy 
 Orchestra Giovanile Italiana

Moldova 
 Moldovan National Youth Orchestra

Netherlands 
 National Youth Orchestra of the Netherlands

Norway 
 Norwegian National Youth Orchestra

Poland 
 Polish Sinfonia Iuventus Orchestra

Portugal 
 Portuguese Youth Orchestra
 Portuguese Chamber Orchestra

Romania 
 Romanian Youth Orchestra

Slovakia 
 Slovak Youth Orchestra

Spain 
 Spanish National Youth Orchestra

Russia 
 Russian National Youth Symphony Orchestra

Sweden 
 El Sistema Sweden National Orchestra
 Stockholm Youth Symphony Orchestra

United Kingdom 
 National Youth Orchestra of Great Britain
 National Children's Orchestra of Great Britain
 National Schools Symphony Orchestra
 National Scout and Guide Symphony Orchestra
 National Youth String Orchestra
 National Youth Wind Orchestra of Great Britain

England 
CBSO Youth Orchestra
City of Sheffield Youth Orchestra
Colne Valley Training Orchestra
Colne Valley Youth Orchestra
Leicestershire Schools Symphony Orchestra
London Schools Symphony Orchestra
Nottingham Youth Orchestra
Reading Youth Orchestra
Somerset County Youth Orchestra
South Tyneside Youth Orchestra
Stockport Youth Orchestra
Suffolk Youth Orchestra
Tees Valley Youth Orchestra
Wessex Youth Orchestra

Scotland 
 National Youth Orchestras of Scotland
 West of Scotland Schools Symphony Orchestra

Wales 
 National Youth Orchestra of Wales

Oceania

Australia
 Australian Youth Orchestra
 ABC Sinfonia
 Adelaide Youth Orchestra
 Australian Youth Orchestra
 Melbourne String Ensemble
 Northern Sydney Youth Orchestra
 Queensland Youth Orchestras
 SBS Radio and Television Youth Orchestra
 Sydney Youth Orchestra
 Victorian Youth Symphony Orchestra
 West Australian Youth Jazz Orchestra

New Zealand 
 National Youth Orchestra of New Zealand

Americas 

 American Heritage Lyceum Philharmonic

Canada 
 National Youth Orchestra of Canada
 Montreal Youth Symphony Orchestra
 New Brunswick Youth Orchestra
 Richmond Delta Youth Orchestra
 Saskatoon Youth Orchestra
 Toronto Symphony Youth Orchestra
 Vancouver Youth Symphony Orchestra

Chile 
 National Youth Symphony Orchestra of Chile

Colombia
 Colombian Youth Philharmonic

Dominican Republic 
 National Youth Symphony Orchestra of the Dominican Republic

United States 

 National Youth Orchestra of the United States of America

Venezuela 

 Simón Bolívar Symphony Orchestra
 Simón Bolívar Youth Symphonic Band

See also
List of symphony orchestras

Classical music lists
Lists of musicians
Lists of orchestras